Kahani Kismat Ki (The story of destiny) is a 1973 Hindi film produced and directed by Arjun Hingorani. The film's success prodded the director to try to recreate its success by continuing with its lead actor and film titles having 3 words starting with the alphabet K. (i.e. Katilon Ke Kaatil). The film stars Dharmendra, Rekha and Ajit in key roles.

Synopsis
Ajit Sharma and his father are robber. One day while heist his father is shot and he is arrested by the police and sentenced to two years in jail. After he completes his sentence, he decides to be honest and seek employment, but without any success. Then one day he wins some money after beating a wrestler. He decides to buy some necessities for his family, which inter alia consists of a school-bag. When Gopuram opens the bag, he finds it filled with cash. The family is enraged that Ajit has obtained these funds through crime, but Ajit defends himself, finds out who the owner (Premchand) is and returns the money to him. A gratified Premchand employs Ajit with a generous remuneration. Ajit meets with Premchand's daughter, Rekha, and both fall in love, and would like to get married. Before that could happen, a woman comes forward claiming that Ajit is her husband, and is also the father of a child; the police arrest Ajit for the murder of a man named Karamchand. As a result, Premchand fires him from employment, his family will have nothing to do with him, and Ajit must now come to terms that he may face the death penalty.

Cast
 Dharmendra as Ajit Sharma
 Rekha as Rekha
 Ajit as Premchand
 Rajendranath as Gopuram Sharma
 Jayshree T. as Chanda
 Sulochana Latkar as Laxmi Sharma
 Bharat Bhushan as Doctor
 Abhi Bhattacharya as Mr. Sharma
 M. B. Shetty as Jaggu
 Yunus Parvez as Chanda's Father
 Arjun Hingorani as Karamchand
 Leena Das as Dancer / Singer

Soundtrack
All songs were written by Rajendra Krishan, with music by Kalyanji-Anandji.

References

External links 
 

1973 films
1970s Hindi-language films
Films scored by Kalyanji Anandji